Syed Abdul Karim alias Tunda, was a bomb maker of terror outfit Lashkar-e-Toiba, and was accused of masterminding over 40 bombings in India supported by  Pakistani terrorists. He was arrested by Indian authorities on 16 August 2013 from the India-Nepal border at Banbasa. However, the exact timings of this arrest is disputed with various versions being reported.. Later, he received a clean chit by a Delhi court in all four cases against him, although he was sentenced to life imprisonment for bomb blasts in Sonipat, Haryana.

Early life
Born in 1943 at Chatta Lal Miya area in central Delhi's Dariyaganj area, he started his career as a carpenter at his native village in Bazaar Khurd area in Pilkhuwa in Uttar Pradesh's Ghaziabad district. He married for the first time here in Uttar Pradesh. He came to Behrampura, Ahmedabad in 1982 and started carpentry and scrap business. He looked after a mosque and taught holy books to children. He married for the second time, Mumtaz and had a son, Irshaan after a year of a marriage. He returned to Delhi in 1989. He married for the third time an 18-year-old girl, at the age of 65 in Pakistan. He has 6 children.

Later life
He came under the police radar after the Mumbai serial bombings in 1993. He got the moniker Tunda – Hindi/ Bengali (Bangla) for without a hand or physically handicapped- after his left hand got severed in an accident while preparing a bomb in 1985 in Mumbai. His younger brother Abdul Malik, who still is a carpenter, is reportedly the only immediate family member alive in India. He also stayed in Pakistan where he is known to have imparted training on fabrication of IED and other explosives to mujahids who were sent to India from Pakistan for jihad. During his stay in Pakistan, he had been in touch with organisations like ISI, LeT, Jaish-e-Mohammed, Indian Mujahideen and Babbar Khalsa and had been meeting people like Hafiz Saeed, Maulana Masood Azhar, Zaki-ur-Rehman Lakhvi, Dawood Ibrahim and several others wanted by India. He was using an elaborate network of human traffickers and fake currency suppliers active in Bangladesh. Tunda has also been associated with Rohingya operatives in the past. His association with LeT commanders Rehan alias Zafar and Azam Cheema alias Babajee is well known.

Role in terrorism

After being indoctrinated by Pakistan's Inter-Services Intelligence (ISI) in the 1980s, Tunda became a jihadi at the age of 40. After allegedly masterminding 1993 Mumbai serial blasts, in 1994, he fled to Bangladesh where he taught making bombs to jihadi elements and in 1998, he acted as 'mentor' to give training to younger generation of Lashkar operatives in terror camps in Pakistan. In 1994, Tunda's name surfaced in Chhattisgarh Express bomb blast near Ghaziabad railway station that claimed 19 lives. In 1994, it is said that Delhi Police and the intelligence bureau also raided Ashok Nagar area after receiving a tip-off from sources. But Tunda managed to escape before being nabbed. But, security agencies found explosives, detonators, Pak made weapons and objectionable documents written in Urdu from his hideout in huge quantity. In 1996, an Interpol Red Corner notice was issued against Tunda. In 1997, after returning to India, he was involved in a bomb blast that took place near Punjabi Bagh in west Delhi in a Blueline bus that killed at least four people and injured around 24 people. It is believed that he died in a blast in Bangladesh in 2000 but Abdul Razzaq, an LeT operative arrested by the Delhi police in 2005, revealed about his presence in Pakistan.
Tunda's name was on number 15 in a dossier of "most wanted terrorists" that India handed over to Pakistan after 26/11 Mumbai terror attacks. He is also believed to be guiding the banned Students Islamic Movement of India (SIMI), which later turned into Indian Mujahideen. Besides that, he was planning to 'recruit' Rohingyas from Myanmar to target Buddhists there. He had also tried to carry out serial explosions in the national capital Delhi, just before the Commonwealth Games in 2010, but the plan was foiled as his accomplices were arrested. According to reports, it has emerged that Tunda aims at carrying out blasts at crowded places and inflict maximum casualties. A close aide of underworld don Dawood Ibrahim, Jamaat-ud-Dawa chief Hafiz Mohammad Saeed and top LeT commander Zaki-ur-Rehman Lakhvi, an "expert bomb maker", Tunda is accused of masterminding over 40 cases of bomb blasts in Mumbai, Delhi, Uttar Pradesh, Haryana, Punjab, Hyderabad and Surat. 70-year-old Tunda is one of the prized catch by the Delhi police in the war against terror, who took shelter in various countries after fleeing India 20 years back. He also had a major hand in spreading Laskhar-e-Taiba's network outside Jammu and Kashmir.

Arrest
The Special Cell of Delhi Police arrested 70 years old Tunda on 16 August 2013 at around 3 pm in Uttarakhand's Banbasa area close to the Nepal border on the basis of an information provided by R&AW, He was possessing a Pakistani passport issued on 23 January 2013. He was arrested in 2013, and was taken to court. Delhi court discharges LeT bomb expert Abdul Karim Tunda. Tunda was sentenced to life imprisonment by a trial court in October 2017 for his involvement in the 1996 Sonepat bomb blasts in Haryana.

Health
He was admitted to AIIMS New Delhi upon report of Health Complications. The angiography procedure revealed blockages in vessels in his heart. Doctors have implanted a Pacemaker into his heart after taking permission from his Lawyer Advocate M S Khan.

See also
List of terrorist incidents in India
Pakistan and state sponsored terrorism

References

1943 births
1993 Bombay bombings
Fugitives
Fugitives wanted by India
Fugitives wanted on terrorism charges
Indian criminals
20th-century Indian Muslims
Living people
Indian people imprisoned on charges of terrorism
People convicted on terrorism charges
Prisoners sentenced to life imprisonment by India
Indian prisoners sentenced to life imprisonment